Fonts Ufanes is an intermittent spring located near the Sant Miquel hermitage, in Campanet municipality of the north of Majorca. 
The underground water flows from the mountains (Puig Tomir) to Sant Miquel stream, which l'Albufera is the base level.

This spring is the main source of water of l'Albufera, an important natural reserve of the Balearic Islands.

See also
 Serra de Tramuntana

References
http://www.caib.es/sites/espaisnaturalsprotegits/ca/monumento_natural_de_ses_fonts_ufanes-21483/

Springs of Spain
Geography of Mallorca